Novakovich is a surname. It may be the transliteration of the South  Slavic surname  Novaković or of the Russian or Bulgarian spelled surname Новакович.

Notable people  with this surname include:

Andrija Novakovich, American professional soccer player
Josip Novakovich,  Croatian Canadian writer
Yuliya Novakovich,  Belarusian weightlifter